Actinocorallia is a genus in the phylum Actinomycetota (Bacteria).

Etymology
The name Actinocorallia derives from:Greek noun ', a beam; Latin noun corallium, coral; New Latin feminine gender noun Actinocorallia, meaning an actinomycete microorganism that forms sporophores resembling coral.

Species
The genus contains 7 species (including basonyms and synonyms), namely
 A. aurantiaca ( (Lavrova and Preobrazhenskaya 1975) Zhang et al. 2001; New Latin feminine gender adjective aurantiaca, orange-coloured, referring to the gold-colored substrate mycelium.), was formerly known as Actinomadura aurantiaca
 A. aurea ( Tamura et al. 2007; Latin feminine gender adjective aurea, golden.), formerly known as "Sarraceniospora aurea"
 A. cavernae ( Lee 2006; Latin genitive case noun cavernae, of a cavern), was isolated from a cave in Jeju, Korea
 A. glomerata ( (Itoh et al. 1996) Zhang et al. 2001; Latin feminine gender participle adjective glomerata, (from Latin v. glomerare, to form into ball, glomerate), formed into a ball, glomerated.), formerly known as Actinomadura glomerata
 A. herbida ( Iinuma et al. 1994,  (Type species of the genus).; Latin feminine gender adjective herbida, like grass, grassy, referring to the formation of aerial mycelia like grass.)
 A. libanotica ( (Meyer 1981) Zhang et al. 2001; Latin noun Libanus, Lebanon; Latin feminine gender suff. -tica, suff. denoting made of or belonging to; New Latin feminine gender adjective libanotica, belonging to Lebanon (the country in which the soil sample was taken).), was formerly known as Actinomadura libanotica
 A. longicatena ( (Itoh et al. 1996) Zhang et al. 2001; Latin adjective longus, long; Latin feminine gender noun catena, chain; New Latin feminine gender noun longicatena, a long chain.)

See also
 Bacterial taxonomy
 Microbiology

References 

Bacteria genera
Actinomycetales